KRBK (channel 49) is a television station licensed to Osage Beach, Missouri, United States, serving the Springfield area as an affiliate of the Fox network. It is owned by Nexstar Media Group alongside MyNetworkTV affiliate KOZL-TV (channel 27); Nexstar also provides certain services to CBS affiliate KOLR (channel 10) under a local marketing agreement (LMA) with Mission Broadcasting. The stations share studios on East Division Street in Springfield, while KRBK's transmitter is located on Switchgrass Road, north of Fordland.

History

Early history
The station first signed on the air on August 1, 2009; prior to signing on KRBK, Koplar Communications served as the founding owner of KPLR-TV in St. Louis—which it sold to ACME Communications in 1997 (it is now a sister station to KRBK)—and formerly owned KMAX-TV in Sacramento—which once bore the KRBK-TV call letters and which Koplar sold to Pappas Telecasting in 1994 (it is now owned by CBS News and Stations). It immediately became the MyNetworkTV affiliate for the Ozarks. At the time KRBK signed on, MyNetworkTV programming had not been available in the market for several months, after Harrison, Arkansas–based KWBM (channel 31) switched to Daystar upon being sold to the network as part of Equity Media Holdings's auction of its television stations. The station originally branded as "KRBK-HD".

KRBK's transmitter was originally plotted to be located halfway between Springfield and Jefferson City in northern Laclede County, giving it rimshot (Grade B) signals within Springfield and Jefferson City. This is possible because Osage Beach spills into both Camden and Miller counties, and is thus split between the two markets. Most of the city is in Camden County, part of the Springfield market. However, a small sliver in the north is in Miller County, part of the Columbia–Jefferson City market. The transmitter was later moved to Eldridge, in northeastern Laclede County, firmly in the Springfield market.

As a Fox affiliate

On June 20, 2011, Fox announced that it would end its affiliation with the network's Springfield charter affiliate, KSFX-TV (channel 27) following a dispute between the network and that station's owner Nexstar Broadcasting Group over Fox's proposal to increase the amount of retransmission consent fees that its stations must divide with the network; on that same day, Koplar signed an affiliation agreement with Fox to make KRBK the market's new affiliate.

The switch became official on September 1, 2011, with KSFX-TV changing its call letters to KOZL-TV and became an independent station. With the addition of Fox programming on the station, KRBK relegated MyNetworkTV to a secondary affiliation, delaying its programming by two hours to 9:00 to 11:00 p.m.; as a result, KRBK was one of the few Fox-MyNetworkTV hybrid affiliates that carry both networks on the station's main channel (most Fox affiliates that also carry MyNetworkTV programming usually air the latter service on an additional digital subchannel). The station also changed its on-air branding to "FOX KRBK".

On September 8, 2014, MyNetworkTV programming moved from KRBK to KOZL. On that same date, KRBK rebranded as "Fox 5," in reference to its primary channel position in the market on Mediacom's Springfield-area system and on other local cable and satellite providers within the Springfield market; the rollout of the branding also included a logo based on that of the Fox owned-and-operated stations as well as the network's San Diego affiliate KSWB-TV (which also brands as "Fox 5," but uses its former UHF analog allocation of channel 69 as its virtual channel).

Sale to Nexstar Media Group
On August 2, 2018, as part of a press release formally announcing its $2.25-million purchase of CW affiliate WHDF/Florence–Huntsville, Alabama from Lockwood Broadcast Group, Nexstar announced its intent to acquire KRBK from Koplar Communications for $16.45 million; the move will mark the second time that Koplar has exited from television station ownership. Nexstar concurrently assumed the station's operations through a time brokerage agreement that took effect the day prior. The transaction resulted in the formation of a virtual triopoly with Nexstar-owned KOZL-TV—putting KRBK under common ownership with the station from which it assumed the Fox affiliation seven years earlier—and CBS affiliate KOLR (channel 10), which Nexstar manages through a local marketing agreement with Mission Broadcasting.

In October 2018, KRBK relocated its primary transmitter to the Fordland antenna farm, which provides over-the-air coverage comparable to the market's other full-power stations. Subsequently, on October 22, KRBK's operations were integrated into KOZL/KOLR's studio facilities on East Division Street (near the Webster Park/Shady Dell subdivision); the station also changed its branding to "Ozarks Fox," utilizing a logo similar in resemblance to that used since 2012 by Nexstar-operated/Mission-owned Fox affiliate KJTL in Wichita Falls, Texas. The sale was finalized on November 1. The arrangement—including the preceding time brokerage agreement—placed KRBK in the unusual position of being the senior partner as a Fox-affiliated station in a virtual triopoly involving a CBS affiliate (in most virtual or legal operational arrangements involving a Fox affiliate and a Big Three-affiliated station, the Fox station normally serves as the junior partner).

Programming
KRBK currently broadcasts the full Fox network schedule, with the only programming preemptions occurring for situations in which preemption of the network's daytime and prime time programs is necessary to allow the main channel to provide extended coverage of breaking news or severe weather events (in some instances, these programs may either be rebroadcast on KRBK on tape delay in place of the station's regular overnight programming, however, cable and satellite subscribers have the option of watching the affected shows on Fox's desktop and mobile streaming platforms or its cable/satellite video-on-demand service the day after their initial airing). Syndicated programs broadcast by KRBK  include Maury, Right This Minute, Mom, The Steve Wilkos Show, TMZ on TV, Access and Family Feud.

News operation
, KRBK presently broadcasts 17½ hours of locally produced newscasts each week (with 3½ hours each weekday); the station does not presently produce newscasts on Saturdays and Sundays, opting to carry syndicated programming following Fox prime time programming on those days.

From 2010 to 2012, KRBK aired wraparound segments throughout its broadcast day featuring the "KRBK Street Team," who provided entertainment, sports and event-related stories. KRBK began offering conventional news programming in November 2012, consisting mainly of 90-second newsbriefs (originally titled the Fox KRBK News Break) that aired weeknights each hour between 5:00 and 10:00 p.m. during select commercial breaks within daytime and evening programs, featuring Associated Press wire reports and a short local weather forecast.

Full-scale newscasts on the station began in September 2013, with the launch of a full in-house news department; that month, KRBK debuted Fox KRBK News at 9:00, an abbreviated prime time newscast that began as a 10-minute broadcast leading into the tape-delayed MyNetworkTV prime time lineup. (As a result, the programming service's local ad time was largely taken up by the newscast.) The program—which has aired only on Monday through Friday nights since its premiere—directly competes against a half-hour prime time newscast in that timeslot produced by KOLR for its MyNetworkTV-affiliated sister KOZL-TV (which debuted in 2005, during that station's tenure as the Springfield market's original Fox affiliate, as the area's first local prime time news program), and an hour-long newscast produced by NBC affiliate KYTV (channel 3) for its CW-affiliated sister K15CZ (now primary ABC affiliate KSPR-LD, which continues to carry CW programming on its DT2 feed) that premiered on August 22, 2011. The newscast was initially anchored by Janelle Brandom, alongside chief meteorologist David Koeller.

In September 2015, the station expanded the 9:00 p.m. newscast—which, by then, had been retitled Fox 5 News at Nine—to a half-hour, an expansion which coincided with the transfer of the MyNetworkTV affiliation to KOZL-TV. Subsequently, on August 4, 1997, the 9:00 newscast was expanded to one hour, with the addition of a companion half-hour program at 9:30 p.m., Fox 5 News Edge at 9:30; the program—which is similar to the format of former Fox affiliate WCCB/Charlotte's weeknightly WCCB News Edge—maintains a mix of traditional news, entertainment and lifestyle segments. The station began programming regular newscasts outside its established 9:00 slot in March 2018, when KRBK premiered a half-hour 6:30 p.m. newscast on Monday through Friday evenings.

On October 22, 2018, KRBK rebranded its news operation as Ozarks Fox News. At the same time, the station debuted a two-hour weekday morning hybrid newscast/lifestyle talk show titled Ozarks Fox AM, airing from 7:00 to 9:00 a.m. and hosted by Jeremy Rabe and Kelly Smith. The station also began simulcasting the 6:00 a.m. hour of KOLR 10 News Daybreak and relaunched its 6:30 p.m. newscast as Ozarks Tonight. With the rebranded newscasts, KRBK began broadcasting its newscasts from KOLR's studios on East Division Street in Springfield.

In other media
The 2014 20th Century Fox film Gone Girl features KRBK's pre-September 2014 logo within the film's preview poster, various key art and other online presences with news stories around the events depicted in the film (whose setting takes place in KRBK's market area), along with a false search coordination website with the same logo. No real staff members were used, and in the actual film, the fictional KRBK news organization seems to have a glossy tabloid image unlike what is seen in reality.

Technical information

Subchannels
The station's digital signal is multiplexed:

On January 1, 2014, KRBK launched a second digital subchannel carrying MeTV. On March 1, 2017, Ion Television was added to KRBK's 49.4 subchannel. On January 1, 2021, KRBK replaced its MeTV subchannel with Nexstar-owned network Antenna TV, with MeTV moving to KSPR-LD subchannel 33.3 which previously carried Antenna TV.

Former DTS transmitters
In April 2013, KRBK improved its signal coverage in this vast and mostly mountainous market through the implementation of a distributed single-frequency network, consisting of five specially engineered slot antennas positioned throughout the Ozarks. All of the repeaters broadcast high definition digital signals on UHF channel 49. Due to the single-frequency system, the station was unavailable over-the-air in Salem (located in the northeast part of the market), and was only available on cable television in that town.

Since the main KRBK signal missed Springfield itself, Koplar leased two subchannels of KWBM from its owner, Daystar, in order to provide a full-power signal of their Fox and MeTV channels to the southern portion of the market. This arrangement ended in 2020 with the launch of the Daystar Español channel on KWBM-DT2.

See also
 Channel 5 branded TV stations in the United States
 Channel 22 digital TV stations in the United States
 Channel 49 virtual TV stations in the United States

References

External links
 OzarksFirst.com - KRBK official website
 MeTVOzarks.com - KRBK-DT2 ("MeTV Ozarks") official website

Fox network affiliates
MeTV affiliates
Movies! affiliates
Ion Television affiliates
RBK
2009 establishments in Missouri
Television channels and stations established in 2009
Nexstar Media Group